James Hislop or Hyslop may refer to:

Hislop
John Hislop (James John Henry Hislop, 1825–1909), British-Australian ex-convict teacher
Jamie Hislop (born 1954), Canadian ice hockey player
James Gordon Hislop (1895–1972), Australian physician and politician

Hyslop
James Hyslop (poet) (1798–1827), Scottish poet
James Hyslop (physician) (1856–1917), Scottish-South African physician and pioneer of psychiatry in South Africa; military medical officer of the South African Medical Service
James A. Hyslop (1885–1953), American entomologist
James E. Hyslop (1862–1931), Scottish businessman
James H. Hyslop (1854–1920), American psychologist and psychic researcher
James Morton Hyslop (1908–1984), Scottish mathematician and educationalist